Ormocarpopsis parvifolia is a species of flowering plant in the family Fabaceae. It is found only in Madagascar.

References

parvifolia
Endemic flora of Madagascar
Vulnerable plants
Taxonomy articles created by Polbot